Eugene O'Doherty (4 Feb 1896 – 24 March 1979) was the Bishop of the Roman Catholic Diocese of Dromore, Northern Ireland.

Early life and priestly ministry
O'Doherty was educated at St Columb's College, Derry and St Patrick's College, Maynooth. Ordained a priest for the Diocese of Derry in 1921, he undertook postgraduate studies and received a D.D. for his thesis, Doctrinal Process and its Laws.   He spent much of his priestly ministry in education on the staff of St. Columb's College being appointed vice president in 1939 and eventually succeeded as President in 1943.

He was appointed Bishop of Dromore within months of his assuming the post. The appointment was made on 11 March 1944 and he received episcopal consecration on Pentecost Sunday, 23 May 1944.

His term as bishop 

While O'Doherty was bishop 18 new schools were opened across the diocese.

He was in charge of implementing the Second Vatican Council's changes to the liturgy.

He retired in November 1975 and died four years later.

References

1896 births
1979 deaths
Roman Catholic bishops of Dromore
20th-century Roman Catholic bishops in Ireland
People from County Donegal
People educated at St Columb's College
Alumni of St Patrick's College, Maynooth